Vandoliers is an American alternative country music group from Texas founded in 2015. They were signed to Bloodshot Records, and have released four studio albums.

Background 
Vandoliers was formed in 2015 by Joshua Fleming, following the dissolution of his Fort Worth-based punk trio The Phuss, and an eye infection that left him nearly blind for eight weeks. During his recovery period, he discovered The Marty Stuart Show and the similarities between punk and country, and wrote the material that would go on to become the Vandoliers' debut album, Ameri-Kinda, during a fit of inspiration one weekend. With help from producer John Pedigo (The O's), Fleming put together a DFW supergroup featuring members of well-known local folk and metal groups Whiskey Folk Ramblers, Vinyl, Revolution Nine and Armadillo Creek, and rounding out the pair's Ameri-Kinda demos.

The following year, the band signed to State Fair Records, and in October 2016, the label re-released the album. Its follow-up, The Native, was recorded in the same studio where Willie Nelson made Red Headed Stranger, and released in May 2017. The album is noted for ushering in a cowpunk resurgence, leading to shows and tours with the likes of Reverend Horton Heat and Old 97's among others.

2019 saw the band release its third album, Forever, via Bloodshot Records, its first for the label. The album was supported by extensive touring, including co-headlining dates with Cory Branan, and an opening slot with Lucero (band). Following 2020's pandemic-slowed year -- which saw the sale of Bloodshot Records, and the band's subsequent departure from the label -- the band re-grouped to record its fourth LP, The Vandoliers. It was self-released under the band's own newly-formed label Amerikinda Records. In the months leading up to its release, the band toured with Flogging Molly, including its annual St. Patrick's Day celebration in Los Angeles.

Members 
Joshua Fleming - lead vocals, acoustic guitar
Cory "Round Up" Graves - backing vocals, keys, trumpet, bass, harmonica
Dustin Fleming - electric guitar, pedal steel
Trey Alfaro - drums, percussion
Travis "McFiddlesticks" Curry - fiddle
Mark Moncrieff - bass

Discography 
 "Ameri-Kinda" (State Fair Records, 2016)
 "The Native" (State Fair Records, Soundly, 2017)
 "Forever" (Bloodshot Records, 2019)
 "The Vandoliers" (Amerikinda Records, Soundly, 2022)

References

Further reading

External links

American alternative country groups
2015 establishments in Texas
Musical groups from Dallas
Musical groups established in 2015